The Chief Scientist Office is part of the Health and Wellbeing Directorate of the Scottish Government. The Chief Scientist is currently Professor David Crossman.

Professional issues relating to Healthcare science in the NHS in Scotland are the responsibility of Jacqui Lunday, the Chief Health Professions Officer for Scotland.

See also
Health Science Scotland

References

External links

Scotland
Health
Health in Scotland
Scotland
Healthcare science in the United Kingdom
NHS Scotland